Steel Tears is the seventh album by folk guitarist Sandy Bull, released in 1996 through Timeless Recording Society. It was Bull's final album before his death in 2001.

Track listing

Personnel 
Sandy Bull – vocals, guitar

References 

1996 albums
Sandy Bull albums